Gilboa Prison is a high security prison in northern Israel, less than  from the West Bank.  It was built in 2004.

History
On 6 September 2021 it was the scene of the Gilboa Prison break, an escape  by six Palestinian militants: Zakaria Zubeidi of the Al-Aqsa Brigades and five from Islamic Jihad. By 19 September all of the six escapees had been recaptured by Israeli forces.

References

Prisons in Israel